Big Bill Mountain is a summit in the U.S. state of Montana.

Big Bill Mountain was named in 1914 after a trail supervisor.

References

Mountains of Flathead County, Montana
Mountains of Montana